Anatoly Banishevskiy Stadium is a multi-use stadium in Masally, Azerbaijan.  It is currently used mostly for football matches, was the home stadium of FK Masallı, and is named after the UEFA Golden Player for Azerbaijan Anatoliy Banishevskiy (1946–1997).  The stadium holds 7,500 people.

Football venues in Azerbaijan